This is a list of awards and award nominations received by Common, the American hip hop recording artist, actor, film producer and poet.

Academy Awards 

|-
|2015
|"Glory" (with John Legend)
|rowspan="2"|Best Original Song
|
|-
|2018
|"Stand Up for Something" (with Diane Warren)
|
|}

African-American Film Critics Association 

|-
|2014
|"Glory" (with John Legend)
|Best Music
|
|}

BET Awards

|-
|rowspan="3"|2003
|rowspan="3"|"Love of My Life (An Ode to Hip-Hop)" (with Erykah Badu)
|Video of the Year
|
|-
|Viewer's Choice
|
|-
|Best Collaboration
|
|-
|2006
|rowspan="7"|Himself
|rowspan="2"|Best Male Hip Hop Artist
|
|-
|2008
|
|-
|2009
|rowspan="2"|Best Actor
|
|-
|rowspan="2"|2012
|
|-
|Centric Award
|
|-
|2013
|Best Actor
|
|-
|rowspan="3"|2015
|Best Male Hip Hop Artist
|
|-
|rowspan="2"|"Glory" (with John Legend)
|Video of the Year
|
|-
|Best Collaboration
|
|}

BET Hip Hop Awards

|-
| rowspan=2|2006
| "Testify"
| Hip-Hop Video of the Year
| 
|-
| rowspan=4|Himself
| rowspan=2|Lyricist of the Year
| 
|-
|rowspan=5| 2007
| 
|-
| MVP of the Year
| 
|-
| Best Live Performance
| 
|-
| "The People"
| Best Hip Hop Video
| 
|-
| Finding Forever
| CD of the Year
| 
|-
| 2012
| The Dreamer/The Believer
| CD of the Year
| 
|-
| 2014
| "Kingdom" (featuring Vince Staples)
| rowspan=2|Impact Track
| 
|-
| 2015
| "Glory" (From The Motion Picture Selma) (with John Legend)
| 
|}

Black Reel Awards 

|-
| 2003
| "Love of My Life (An Ode to Hip-Hop)" (with Erykah Badu)
|rowspan="2"| Best Original or Adapted Song
| 
|-
| 2015
| "Glory" (with John Legend)
| 
|}

CMT Music Awards

|-
| rowspan="1"| 2018
| "Stand Up for Something"
| CMT Performance of the Year
| 
|}

Critics' Choice Movie Awards 

|-
| 2015
| "Glory" (with John Legend)
| Best Song
|

Georgia Film Critics Association 

|-
| 2015
| "Glory" (with John Legend)
| Best Original Song
| 
|}

Golden Globe Awards 

|-
| 2015
| "Glory" (with John Legend)
| Best Original Song 
| 
|}

Grammy Awards

!
|-
| style="text-align:center;" | 2001
| "The Light"
| Best Rap Solo Performance 
|  
|-
| style="text-align:center;" rowspan=3| 2003
| rowspan=3 |"Love of My Life (An Ode to Hip-Hop)" (with Erykah Badu)
| Best Song Written for a Motion Picture, Television or Other Visual Media
| 
|-
| Best R&B Song
| 
|-
| Best Urban/Alternative Performance
| 
|-
| style="text-align:center;" rowspan=4| 2006
| "They Say" (featuring Kanye West & John Legend)
| Best Rap/Sung Collaboration
| 
|-
| "Testify"
| Best Rap Solo Performance
| 
|-
| "The Corner" (featuring The Last Poets)
| Best Rap Performance by a Duo or Group
| 
|-
| Be
| rowspan=2|Best Rap Album
| 
|-
| style="text-align:center;" rowspan=3| 2008
| Finding Forever
| 
|-
| "The People"
| Best Rap Solo Performance
| 
|-
| "Southside" (featuring Kanye West)
| rowspan=2|Best Rap Performance by a Duo or Group
| 
|-
| style="text-align:center;" rowspan=2| 2010
| "Make Her Say" (with Kid Cudi & Kanye West)
|  
|-
| Universal Mind Control
| Best Rap Album 
|  
|-
| style="text-align:center;"| 2011
| "Wake Up Everybody" (with John Legend, The Roots & Melanie Fiona)
| rowspan=2|Best Rap/Sung Collaboration
|  
|-
| style="text-align:center;" rowspan="2"| 2015
| "Blak Majik" (featuring Jhené Aiko)
|  
| rowspan="2"|
|- 
| Nobody's Smiling
| Best Rap Album
|  
|-
| style="text-align:center;" rowspan="3"| 2016 
| rowspan="3"| "Glory" (with John Legend)
| Best Rap Song
|  
|  rowspan="3"|
|- 
| Best Rap/Sung Collaboration
|  
|-
| rowspan="2"|Best Song Written for Visual Media
|  
|- 
| style="text-align:center;" | 2018 
| "Stand Up For Something"
|  
| 
|-

Houston Film Critics Society 

|-
| 2015
| "Glory" (with John Legend)
| Best Original Song
| 
|}

NAACP Image Awards 

|-
|rowspan=3| 2003
|rowspan=3| "Love of My Life (An Ode to Hip-Hop)" (with Erykah Badu)
| Outstanding Duo or Group
| 
|-
| Outstanding Song
| 
|-
| Outstanding Music Video
| 
|-
|rowspan=3| 2006
| Himself
| Outstanding Male Artist
| 
|-
|rowspan=2| "Testify"
| Outstanding Music Video
| 
|-
| Outstanding Song
| 
|-
| 2008
| Himself
| Outstanding Male Artist
| 
|-
| 2009
| Himself
| Outstanding Male Artist
| 
|-
| 2012
| Himself
| Outstanding Male Artist
| 
|-
| 2015
| Himself
| Outstanding Supporting Actor in a Motion Picture
| 
|}

MTV Video Music Awards 

|-
| 2001
| "The Sound of Illadelph (Geto Heaven Remix)"
| Breakthrough Video
| 
|-
| 2003
| "Come Close"
| MTV2 Award
| 
|-
| 2005
| "Go!"
| rowspan=2| Best Hip-Hop Video
| 
|-
| rowspan=3|2006
| rowspan=3 | "Testify"
| 
|-
| Best Direction 
| 
|-
| Best Art Direction 
| 
|}

Primetime Emmy Awards 

|-
| 2017
| 13th ("Letter To The Free")
| Outstanding Original Music and Lyrics
| 
|}

Soul Train Music Awards 

|-
|2003
|"Love of My Life (An Ode to Hip-Hop)"
|Best R&B/Soul Single – Female
|
|-
|rowspan="2"|2006
|"Supastar"
|Best R&B/Soul Single – Group, Band or Duo
|
|-
|"Testify"
|Best R&B/Soul or Rap Music Video
|
|-
|rowspan="3"|2015
|rowspan="3"|"Glory"
|Best Song of the Year
|
|-
|The Ashford & Simpson Songwriter's Award
|
|-
|Best Collaboration
|
|-
|}

Teen Choice Awards

|-
| 2017
| John Wick: Chapter 2 (with Keanu Reeves)
| Choice Movie: Fight
| 
|}

Vibe Awards 

|-
| 2005
| "The Corner"
| Reelest Video
| 
|}

References 

Common
Awards